The black-tailed treecreeper (Climacteris melanurus) is a species of bird in the family Climacteridae. It is endemic to north and northwestern Australia.

Its natural habitats are temperate forests and subtropical or tropical moist lowland forests.

Description 
Both genders are dark brown and black-tailed. The male has a black throat while the female has a white throat.

References

black-tailed treecreeper
Birds of the Northern Territory
Birds of Western Australia
Endemic birds of Australia
black-tailed treecreeper
Taxonomy articles created by Polbot